The Mindanao Media Hub is state-owned broadcast facility in Davao City, Philippines.

Construction
The construction of the Mindanao Media Hub began with the groundbreaking ceremony held on May 3, 2018. It was intended to host the Philippine government's media agencies and was initially projected to be finished by January 2019.
The facility's construction is part of Former Philippine President Rodrigo Duterte to decentralize the operations of the national government, including state media.

By August 2018, the media hub was already 40 percent complete.

The facility was inaugurated on December 15, 2020. Another inauguration was held on March 18, 2021, to mark the full operations of the Mindanao Media Hub.

Tenants
The Mindanao Media Hub is used by the Presidential Communications Office, as well as other attached organizations such as the People's Television Network, Radyo Pilipinas, the Philippine News Agency and the Philippine Information Agency.

References

Television studios in the Philippines
People's Television Network
Philippine Broadcasting Service
Buildings and structures in Davao City